Florence Darel (born in 1968) is a French actress.

Early life
Darel was a pupil of Maurice Sarrazin, the creator of the Grenier de Toulouse, at his Parisian theater school Le Grenier-Maurice Sarrazin.

Career

Personal life
Darel's husband is Pascal Dusapin, a composer. In 2009, Darel's child was born.

In October 2017, she claimed to have been sexually harassed by Harvey Weinstein, 
 as well as by French producers, including Jacques Dorfmann.

Filmography
 Erreur de jeunesse (1989)
 Les Jeux de société (television film, 1989)
 Le Champignon des Carpathes (1990)
 A Tale of Springtime (1990)
 Uranus (1990)
 The Stolen Children (1992)
 A comme Acteur (1992)
 Fausto (1993)
 Der Grüne Heinrich (1994)
 Joan the Maiden, Part 2: The Prisons (1994)
 Don't Let Me Die on a Sunday (1998)
 The Count of Monte Cristo (miniseries, 1998)
 Napoléon (miniseries, 2002)
 Le Intermittenze del cuore (2003)
 Là-haut, un roi au-dessus des nuages (2003)
 Un printemps à Paris (2006)
 La Maison (2007)
 Baby Love (2008)
 Femmes de loi (television film, 2009)
 Le Clan des Lanzac (television film, 2013)
 Soda: Un trop long week-end (television film, 2014)
 À demain sans faute (television film, 2015)
 Les Heures souterraines (television film, 2015)

References

External links
 

1968 births
Living people
20th-century French actresses
21st-century French actresses
French film actresses
French stage actresses
French television actresses